Carl Robert "Slägga" Olsson (14 March 1883 – 21 July 1954) was a Swedish hammer thrower. He competed at the 1908, 1912 and 1920 Summer Olympics with the best result of fourth place in 1908. He was the Swedish Olympic flag bearer at the 1912 Games.

References

1883 births
1954 deaths
Athletes from Gothenburg
Swedish male hammer throwers
Olympic athletes of Sweden
Athletes (track and field) at the 1908 Summer Olympics
Athletes (track and field) at the 1912 Summer Olympics
Athletes (track and field) at the 1920 Summer Olympics
Olympic weight throwers